The Peruvian fish-eating rat (Neusticomys peruviensis) is a species of semiaquatic rodent in the family Cricetidae. It is found only in eastern Peru, where it is known from locations at elevations from 200 to 400 m.

References

Musser, G. G. and M. D. Carleton. 2005. Superfamily Muroidea. pp. 894–1531 in Mammal Species of the World a Taxonomic and Geographic Reference. D. E. Wilson and D. M. Reeder eds. Johns Hopkins University Press, Baltimore.

Neusticomys
Mammals of Peru
Mammals described in 1974
Taxonomy articles created by Polbot